War and Peas is a webcomic by Elizabeth Pich and Jonathan Kunz. 

The comics are in strip format, usually four panels long and characterized by morbid, dark or surreal humour. The comic's world features recurring characters, for example, Slutty Witch, a standalone witch character who counterposes obtrusive suitors, often with black magic.

The title is a play on words using the novel War and Peace by Leo Tolstoy.

Publishing 
Pich and Kunz met at School of Fine Arts in Saarbrücken, Germany. After experimenting with illustrative forms, they found the comic format ideal for their type of storytelling and began to develop the weekly webcomic.

Since 2011, Pich and Kunz have posted once weekly every Sunday to their website and several social media platforms including Instagram, Facebook, and Twitter. They alternate with drawing but usually write together. Starting 2017, they also release their strips on the publishing platform Line Webtoon. Several online and print magazines feature War and Peas comics on a regular basis, including the Italian magazine Internazionale, releasing new strips every week since 2018. War and Peas has been published in several anthologies, such as Launch Party or Block Party – both edited by David Daneman – along with other webcomics, such as Mr. Lovenstein by J.L. Westover, Deathbulge by Dan Martin and Safely Endangered by Chris McCoy. After Nick Seluk introduced the duo to his publisher, their first book, War and Peas: Funny Comics for Dirty Lovers was released by Andrews McMeel Publishing on March 3, 2020. On July 23, the German translation was published by Panini Comics. On November 5, it was followed by the Spanish translation, published by RBA Libros.

Several fan accounts on social media are dedicated to translating the comic strips to various languages, such as French and Russian.

Reception 
War and Peas is largely praised on the internet. Bored Panda referred to War and Peas as "one of the most exciting and funniest webcomics in the world" and fellow webcomic creator Nathan W. Pyle states, "It's so nice, really lovely and clean."

References

External links 
 Website

Webcomics in print
Comedy webcomics
2010s webcomics
2011 webcomic debuts
German webcomics